The Women's time trial of the 2009 UCI Road World Championships cycling event took place on 23 September 2009 in Mendrisio, Switzerland.

Qualification

All National Federations were allowed to register four riders for the race, with a maximum of two riders to start. In addition to this number, the outgoing World Champion and the current continental champions were also able to take part.

Final classification

References

Women's time trial
UCI Road World Championships – Women's time trial
2009 in women's road cycling